Federico García may refer to:

 Federico García Lorca (1898–1936), Spanish poet, playwright and theatre director
 Federico García (footballer) (born 1984), Argentine footballer
 Federico García (skier) (born 1951), Chilean alpine skier in the 1976 Winter Olympics